Zelda Kaplan (June 20, 1916 – February 15, 2012) was a fixture in New York's art, nightclub, and fashion worlds. Her trademark outfit was a matching African-print dress, handbag, and shoes, and a tall cloth hat.

She made numerous philanthropic and humanitarian efforts, frequently traveling to Africa to speak out against female genital mutilation and campaign for the right of women to inherit; in 1995 she spoke to villages in South Africa about birth control. In regard to women's rights, she was quoted by the Village Voice as saying, "It's so important that girls not defer to the penis. I hope to let every girl know that she is somebody."

In 2003, she was profiled in The New York Times. Later that same year HBO premiered a documentary about Kaplan, Her Name Is Zelda, which followed her life from housewife to socialite. In 2006, at the age of 90, she was profiled in The Village Voice. Kaplan also once posed as a subject for her friend the photographer Andres Serrano.

Death
Kaplan died in 2012, aged 95, after collapsing at a runway show for her friend the designer Joanna Mastroianni's new collection at Lincoln Center in New York City during the city's twice yearly fashion week.

References

External links
 The Matriarch of NYC Nights: A biography of Zelda Kaplan; accessed August 25, 2014.

1916 births
2012 deaths
20th-century American Jews
American socialites
People from New York City
People from Flemington, New Jersey
21st-century American Jews